Tomás, Chevalier O'Gorman or Tomás Ó Gormáin (or Mac Gormáin) (1732–1809) was an Irish soldier and genealogist.

Born in Castletown, County Clare, the son of Patrick O'Gorman. His first language was Irish. Thomas O'Gorman is from the MacGorman clan. He was educated as a medical doctor at the Irish College, Paris. He served with the Irish Brigade in the French army, and was created Chevalier by Louis XV.

O'Gorman married a daughter of Count d'Éon, and from him inherited vast vineyards, lost in the French Revolution. After this, he retired to Ireland, where he pursued his antiquarian studies; from about 1764 he corresponded with Charles O'Conor, and had made an impressive collection of Irish manuscripts. He also compiled pedigrees of Irish expatriates, and personally arranged for the Book of Ballymote to be given by the Irish College to the Royal Irish Academy in Dublin.

According to a somewhat dubious legend, O'Gorman received the Brian Boru Harp and gave it to Colonel Burton Conyngham, who transferred it in Trinity College Dublin, where it remains.

See also

 Chevalier d'Éon

References

External links
 
 http://www.limerickcity.ie/media/11%2018%2009.pdf 

18th-century Irish historians
Irish soldiers in the French Army
Irish military doctors
Irish expatriates in France
People from County Clare
18th-century Irish people
19th-century Irish people
Irish-language writers
1732 births
1809 deaths